Christophe "Titou" Lamaison (born 8 April 1971) is a former French rugby union footballer who represented France at international level, and Brive, Agen and Aviron Bayonnais at professional club level. He won 37 caps, and at the time of his retirement was the all-time leading points scorer for France, with 380 points, a mark surpassed in August 2015 by Frédéric Michalak. Lamaison played most of his rugby as a centre, and possessed reliable distribution and kicking skills, which made up for his only real weakness, a lack of pace. He could also play at fly-half. He made his international debut against South Africa on 30 November 1996 in Paris, and rose to prominence as a key member of France's Grand slam-winning sides of 1997 and 1998. His goalkicking ability also helped Brive win the Heineken Cup in 1997 and reach the final in 1998.

Lamaison's finest hour came at the 1999 Rugby World Cup in the semifinal against New Zealand at Twickenham. Selected at fly-half for the match, Lamaison scored a full house of points and set up several tries. He scored the first try of the game, but New Zealand hit back, with Jonah Lomu scoring two tries, to lead 24–10 in the second half. Then Lamaison kicked two drop goals and two penalties, bringing the score back to 24–22. In 13 minutes of rugby, the French scored 26 unanswered points and won 43–31 in one of the biggest upsets in Rugby World Cup history.

In 2000, Lamaison almost repeated his semifinal performance against New Zealand, scoring 27 points in a 42–33 victory. In 2004, he stopped his professional rugby union career despite lucrative offers from the English side Saracens and played for Saint-Médard-en-Jalles in the Fédérale 2. He retired from all rugby in 2006.

References

External links
French rugby records
Profile at BBC 
Match report from 1999 RWC Semi-final
Profile at lequipe.fr
RWC 1999 Semi-final match report at AllBlacks.com
2000 international between All Blacks and France
Profile at ffr.fr
No ifs or buts for `lucky' Lamaison - article from The Independent

1971 births
Living people
People from Dax, Landes
French rugby union players
Rugby union centres
France international rugby union players
Aviron Bayonnais players
Sportspeople from Landes (department)
SU Agen Lot-et-Garonne players
CA Brive players